More Lies from the Gooseberry Bush is the second album by Robert Pollard's solo project, Teenage Guitar. Some editions of this album contained the previous release, Force Fields At Home as an additional bonus disc. Robert Pollard wrote every song and played every instrument on this record.

Track listing 
 Go Around (The Apartment Dwellers)
 Spliced At Acme Fair
 A Guaranteed Ratio
 Good Mary's House
 Skin Ride
 Full Glass Gone
 All You Fought For
 Gear Op
 No Escape
 Matthew's Ticker And Shaft (Four Parts: Come To Breakfast, The Girls Arrive, Division Of Swans, When Death Has A Nice Ring)
 The Instant American
 Normalized
 New Light
 Birthplace Of The Electric Starter
 A Year That Could Have Been Worse

References 

2014 albums
Robert Pollard albums